Wilder House may refer to:

Wilder House (Prescott, Arizona), listed on the National Register of Historic Places (NRHP) in Yavapai County, Arizona
Wilder House (Chatham, Louisiana), listed on the NRHP in Jackson Parish, Louisiana
Wilder House (Ruston, Louisiana), listed on the NRHP in Lincoln Parish, Louisiana
The Wilder Homestead, Buckland, Massachusetts, listed on the NRHP in Franklin County, Massachusetts
General John T. Wilder House, a home of John T. Wilder in Knoxville, Tennessee
John T. Wilder House, a home of John T. Wilder in Roan Mountain, Tennessee